Tricyclohexylphosphine is the tertiary phosphine with the formula P(C6H11)3. Commonly used as a ligand in organometallic chemistry, it is often abbreviated to PCy3, where Cy stands for cyclohexyl. It is characterized by both high basicity (pKa = 9.7) and a large ligand cone angle (170°).

Important complexes containing P(Cy)3 ligands include the 2005 Nobel Prize-winning Grubbs' catalyst and the homogeneous hydrogenation catalyst Crabtree's catalyst.

References

Tertiary phosphines
Cyclohexyl compounds